Callizygaena is a genus of moths belonging to the family Zygaenidae.

The species of this genus are found in India and Sri Lanka.

Species
Species:

Callizygaena ada 
Callizygaena amabilis 
Callizygaena auratus 
Callizygaena aurifasciata 
Callizygaena defasciata 
Callizygaena flaviplaga 
Callizygaena glaucon 
Callizygaena luzonensis 
Callizygaena semperi 
Callizygaena unipuncta 
Callizygaena venusta

References

Zygaenidae
Zygaenidae genera